The 1947 Philadelphia Athletics season involved the A's finishing fifth in the American League with a record of 78 wins and 76 losses.

Except for a fifth-place finish in 1944, the A's finished in last or next-to-last place every year from 1935–1946. In 1947, Connie Mack not only got the A's out of last place, but actually finished with a winning record for the first time in 14 years in a season that would be the first to be aired on television, sharing the same station (WPTZ) as their NL counterparts, the Phillies.

Offseason 
 December 1946: Lou Brissie was signed as an amateur free agent by the Athletics.
 December 13, 1946: Hal Epps was selected off waivers from the Athletics by the St. Louis Cardinals.

Regular season

Season standings

Record vs. opponents

Roster

Player stats

Batting

Starters by position 
Note: Pos = Position; G = Games played; AB = At bats; H = Hits; Avg. = Batting average; HR = Home runs; RBI = Runs batted in

Other batters 
Note: G = Games played; AB = At bats; H = Hits; Avg. = Batting average; HR = Home runs; RBI = Runs batted in

Pitching

Starting pitchers 
Note: G = Games pitched; IP = Innings pitched; W = Wins; L = Losses; ERA = Earned run average; SO = Strikeouts

Other pitchers 
Note: G = Games pitched; IP = Innings pitched; W = Wins; L = Losses; ERA = Earned run average; SO = Strikeouts

Relief pitchers 
Note: G = Games pitched; W = Wins; L = Losses; SV = Saves; ERA = Earned run average; SO = Strikeouts

Farm system 

LEAGUE CHAMPIONS: Savannah

References

External links
1947 Philadelphia Athletics team at Baseball-Reference
1947 Philadelphia Athletics team page at baseball-almanac.com

Oakland Athletics seasons
Philadelphia Athletics season
Oak